Apionichthys finis is a species of sole in the family Achiridae. It was described by Carl H. Eigenmann in 1912, originally under the genus Soleonasus. It inhabits the Essequibo, Potaro and Amazon rivers.

References

Pleuronectiformes
Fish described in 1912